The 1912 Prince Edward Island general election was held in the Canadian province of Prince Edward Island on January 3, 1912.

The election was won by the governing Conservatives, led by incumbent Premier John A. Mathieson, nearly sweeping the island's 30 districts and granting the Conservatives their first clear general election victory since the 1886 election.

Mathieson was designated Premier in December 1911 at the behest of the Lieutenant Governor, following the defeat of  his predecessor, Liberal Premier H. James Palmer in a by-election, one that ultimately shifted the balance of power in the Legislature from a bare Liberal majority to a situation in the Conservative's favour.

H. James Palmer, having no seat in the Legislature and ultimately having lost the confidence of the Legislature, resigned from politics and did not run in this election. It is therefore unknown if Palmer led the Liberals in this election, though his biography at the PEI Legislative Documents Online  archive makes reference to the "Palmer-led Liberals." There is no other listed leader for the Liberals during the election; Assemblyman John Richards led the Liberals as Leader of the Opposition in the 37th Legislature.

Party Standings

Members Elected

The Legislature of Prince Edward Island had two levels of membership from 1893 to 1996 - Assemblymen and Councillors. This was a holdover from when the Island had a bicameral legislature, the General Assembly and the Legislative Council.

In 1893, the Legislative Council was abolished and had its membership merged with the Assembly, though the two titles remained separate and were elected by different electoral franchises. Assembleymen were elected by all eligible voters of within a district, while Councillors were only elected by landowners within a district.

Kings

Prince

Queens

Sources

Further reading
 

1912 elections in Canada
Elections in Prince Edward Island
1912 in Prince Edward Island
January 1912 events